The 1938 season was the Hawthorn Football Club's 14th season in the Victorian Football League and 37th overall.

Fixture

Premiership Season

Ladder

References

Hawthorn Football Club seasons